Frank Cephous (born July 4, 1961) is a former American football running back. He played for the New York Giants in 1984. He is a 2010 inductee of the Delaware Sports Museum and Hall of Fame. Cephous was born and raised in the State of Delaware, where he attended St. Mark's High School. Cephous subsequently attended U.C.L.A. where he played a key role in the Bruins' 1983 Rose Bowl and 1984 Rose Bowl victories. In the 1984 Rose Bowl, he led the team in rushing, with 89 yards in a dozen carries. At U.C.L.A., Cephous was a four-year Letterman.

References

1961 births
Living people
American football running backs
UCLA Bruins football players
New York Giants players